Edward Frank (Eddie) Marsh was the second bishop of Central Newfoundland: he held the see from 1990 until 2000.

Marsh was educated at Dalhousie University and ordained in 1960. He was a curate at Corner Brook and then held incumbencies at Harbour Breton, Wickford, Indian Bay, St John's and Cartwright.

References 

Dalhousie University alumni
Anglican bishops of Central Newfoundland
20th-century Anglican Church of Canada bishops
21st-century Anglican Church of Canada bishops
Living people
Year of birth missing (living people)